The Israel Association of Actuaries is the association for actuaries in Israel.

External links
Official site

Actuarial associations
Professional associations based in Israel